The 1986 Oregon State Beavers football team represented Oregon State University during the 1986 NCAA Division I-A football season.

Schedule

References

Oregon State
Oregon State Beavers football seasons
Oregon State Beavers football